The first season of 8 Simple Rules aired on ABC between September 17, 2002, and May 20, 2003, and consists of 28 episodes. On August 7, 2007, Walt Disney Studios Home Entertainment released the complete first season on DVD on a 3-disc set.

Guest stars throughout season one include: Cybill Shepherd, Jason Priestley, Terry Bradshaw, Nick Carter, Shelley Long, Patrick Warburton, Thad Luckinbill, Billy Aaron Brown and Larry Miller.

Cast and characters

Main cast 
 John Ritter as Paul Hennessey
 Katey Sagal as Cate Hennessey
 Kaley Cuoco as Bridget Hennessey
 Amy Davidson as Kerry Hennessey
 Martin Spanjers as Rory Hennessey

Guest cast 
 Billy Aaron Brown as Kyle
 Larry Miller as Tommy
 Patrick Warburton as Nick Sharpe
 Nikki Danielle Moore as Jenna Sharpe
 Nicole Mansour as Rachel Sharpe
 Cole Williams as Anthony
 Brian Sites as Jason
 Shelley Long as Mary Ellen Doyle
 John Ratzenberger as Fred Doyle
 Thad Luckinbill as Donny Doyle
 Terry Bradshaw as Steve "Canned Heat" Smith
 Matt Funke as Travis "The Rainman" Smith
 Jason Priestley as Carter Tibbits
 Nick Carter as Ben
 Cybill Shepherd as Maggie
 Don Knotts as himself
 Steven Gilborn as Clerk

Episodes

DVD release

References

External links 
 
 

2002 American television seasons
2003 American television seasons
8 Simple Rules